Samba Faye, born April 25, 1987, is a Senegal-born Japanese professional basketball player.  He currently plays for the Toyama Grouses of the Japanese B.League.

Career statistics 

|-
| align="left" |  2012-13
| align="left" | Toshiba
| 6|| || 4.8|| .500|| .000|| .333|| 1.2|| 0.5|| 0.2|| 0||  2.3 
|-
| align="left" |  2013-14
| align="left" | Tokio M
| 32||31 || 34.1|| .434|| .326|| .743|| 12.8|| 1.6|| 0.7|| 0.7||bgcolor="CFECEC"|  24.5* 
|-
| align="left" |  2014-15
| align="left" | Toshiba
| 10|| 0|| 9.8|| .423|| .000|| .750|| 2.2|| 0.3|| 0|| 0.1|| 2.5 
|-
| align="left" | 2014-15
| align="left" | Toyotsu
| 12||10 || 24.9|| .524|| .200|| .759|| 12.0|| 1.4|| 0.3|| 0.3|| 12.8 
|-
| align="left" |  2015-16
| align="left" | Toyotsu
| 32||21 || 19.1|| .511|| .295|| .722|| 7.6|| 0.8|| 0.4|| 0.6||  11.8 
|-
| align="left" |  2016-17
| align="left" | Shiga
| 58||33 || 18.6|| .544|| .200|| .740|| 5.6|| 0.4|| 0.2|| 0.3||  8.2 
|-
| align="left" |  2017-18
| align="left" | Shiga
| 54 || 49 || 21.4 || .543 ||.333  ||.719  ||4.4  ||1.3  || 0.5 ||0.3  ||  9.1
|-
|}

References

1987 births
Living people
Japanese men's basketball players
Japanese people of Senegalese descent
Shiga Lakes players
Sun Rockers Shibuya players
Tokio Marine Nichido Big Blue players
Kawasaki Brave Thunders players
Toyotsu Fighting Eagles Nagoya players
Sportspeople from Thiès
Centers (basketball)